Onomancy (or nomancy) is divination based on a subject's name. Onomancy was popular in Europe during the Late Middle Ages but is said to have originated with the Pythagoreans. Several methods of analyzing a name are possible, some of which are based on arithmancy or gematria.

An early example of onomancy is found in the Secretum Secretorum. The system given there involves adding up the numerical values of the letters in the names of two antagonists, dividing the total for each person by 9, and comparing the remainders with a table which predicts the victor.

In China, Taiwan, and Japan, onomancy is known as 姓名判断 (Chinese: xingming panduan; Japanese: seimei handan). It can take several forms, but the most popular is based on the character strokes in the subject's written name, and the result number will be modulo 81, the remainders 0, 1, 3, 5, 6, 7, 8, 11, 13, 15, 16, 17, 18, 21, 23, 24, 25, 29, 31, 32, 33, 35, 37, 38, 39, 41, 45, 47, 48, 52, 57, 58, 61, 63, 65, 67, 68 are “lucky” numbers.

Notes

References

External links
 

Numerology
Divination
Onomancy